Mountain House is a planned community in San Joaquin County, California. The population was 24,499 at the 2020 census. For statistical purposes, the United States Census Bureau has defined Mountain House as a census-designated place (CDP).

History
The Cholbon triblet of the Northern Valley Yokuts were the original inhabitants of the Mountain House area. Their territory ran along Old River a distributary of the San Joaquin River.

In 1849, Thomas Goodall erected a blue denim cloth tent to serve as a midway stopover for gold miners headed from San Francisco to the Sierra Nevada foothills via Altamont Pass. Goodall eventually built an adobe house at the eastern edge of the Diablo Range hills, calling it The Mountain House. Simon Zimmerman later acquired the stop and it became known as Zimmerman's Mountain House and became a well-known way station stop on the way to Stockton. The last remaining settlement buildings were leveled in 1940.

In November 1994, the San Joaquin County Board of Supervisors officially approved the new community of Mountain House. In 1996, the master plan was approved. In August 2000, many of the documents controlling the development and growth of Mountain House were adopted and approved by the San Joaquin Board of Supervisors acting as the Mountain House Board of Directors.

Mountain House was projected to be a small full-fledged city developed over a 30-year period by the Master Developer Trimark Communities. The town was planned for 12 distinct neighborhoods including 10 family neighborhoods and two age-restricted neighborhoods, each organized around a center containing a neighborhood park, a K-8 school, and a small commercial area.

Construction began in 2001, but growth slowed down to about 50 permits per year because of the Great Recession in 2008. Development started again with increasing building permits and small land development projects in 2010 and 2011 and has continued at and still continues at a high rate.

As of today, Mountain House includes the established villages of Wicklund, Bethany, Altamont, and Questa, along with the developing villages of Hansen, Cordes, and College Park. Some 15,000 households or approximately 45,000–50,000 people are anticipated when Mountain House is fully completed.

Milestones
 November 10, 1994 – Mountain House project approved by San Joaquin County Board of Supervisors.
 May 14, 2001 – Trimark breaks ground on Mountain House project.
 January 18, 2003 – First home foundation poured.
 August 24, 2004 – Wicklund Elementary School opens. MHCSD opens an office at Wicklund Elementary School.
 November 6, 2007 – Mountain House votes to form an independent board for the MH Community Services District (MHCSD).
 December 7, 2007 – The San Joaquin Delta College satellite campus site is annexed to Mountain House CSD through a public-private partnership with developer Gerry N. Kamilos.
 November 2008 – Noted for having the highest percentage of underwater mortgages in the U.S.
 November 2008 – First independent board of the MHCSD was elected.
 August 17, 2009 – Delta College Mountain House Campus opens.
 June 8, 2010 – Voters approve unification of Lammersville Unified School District.
 January 2011 – 15-year-old resident Thia Megia becomes youngest finalist ever on American Idol.
 July 2012 – Mountain House High School breaks ground.
 March 2013 – New development announced for Questa and Altamont Villages.
 August 2014 – Mountain House High School opens.
 June 2015 – Drought conditions place Mountain House water supply at risk.
 September 2018 – Mountain House breaks ground on town hall complex.
 March 2020 – Town Hall and Library opens
 June 2021 – Safeway breaks ground on the town center, which is a retail shopping center.
 January 12, 2022 - A large retail center opens in Cordes Village, which would be including a pizza place, sandwich shop, dental office, and jiu-jitsu studio, since new businesses have moved there and lots of changes happened.
 Dec 2022 – Safeway opens a 55,562-square-foot supermarket in Mountain House.

Financial downturn
In November 2008, The New York Times reported that Mountain House was the "most underwater community in America" – the ZIP code with the highest amount of negative equity on its homes. With home values decreasing across the nation, Mountain House was described as the worst-hit, with 90% of its homes worth less than the amount their owners owe in mortgages. The average homeowner in Mountain House was reported to be $122,000 in debt. Many local businesses in the 95391 ZIP code were closing because the homeowners were cutting back on their spending.

CalPERS, an agency that manages pensions for California public employees, invested heavily in Mountain House beginning in 2005, purchasing approximately 9,000 residential lots from Shea Homes. By May 2010, the $1.12 billion investment by CalPERS had been reduced to 18% of that figure: $200 million. Even though home values had dropped significantly, CalPERS determined that they would hold on to the investment, counting on a recovery of the housing market.

Economic recovery
An uptick in economic performance at Mountain House was noted in September 2011 by Big Builder, a trade magazine of major land and housing development published by Hanley-Wood.

Acknowledging the New York Times 2008 article that branded Mountain House as the most underwater community in America, the article chronicled a grassroots commitment by residents to keep their neighborhoods looking well-kept by mowing neglected lawns of homes in foreclosure, short sales or abandoned.

This community spirit helped persuade CalPERS to hold onto its Mountain House investment, despite the drawbacks of a 1994-vintage land plan, termed "out of sync with the realities of the post-housing crash world". Helping to balance the challenges of the land plan was the level of established infrastructure and homebuyers motivated by affordable pricing, proximity to job centers and traditional neighborhoods.

In April 2012, Big Builder again reported on the community, noting more robust first-quarter sales, new lot offers, and flexibility for semi-finished and raw land in future development.

Geography
It is on the border of Alameda and Contra Costa counties. The census definition of the area may not precisely correspond to local understanding of the area with the same name. The community is bisected by Mountain House Creek. Mountain House Creek originates south of the Altamont Pass and Interstate 580, flowing northeasterly along and crossing under the interstate, then along Grant Line Road to the intersection with Mountain House Road at the historic Alameda County Mountain House. The creek continues northeasterly through the residential communities of Mountain House before emptying into the Old River, a distributary of the San Joaquin River.

Climate
Winter (December–February) temperatures in Mountain House range from the 30s to 60s °F (-1 to 20.5 °C). Springs (March–May) in Mountain House are mild with temperatures in the 40s to 80s °F (4.4 to 31.7 °C). Summers (June–August) can be very hot with temperatures in the 80s to 100s °F (26.7 to 42.8 °C). Fall (September–November) temperatures start in the 80s to 100s °F (26.7 to 42.8 °C) but cool down significantly by November to the 40s to 70s °F (4.4 to 26.1 °C). Windy conditions are common.

Nearby cities and communities 
 Tracy (San Joaquin County) - 4.2 miles
 Livermore (Alameda County) - 15.6 miles
 Byron (Contra Costa County) - 9.2 miles
 Discovery Bay (Contra Costa County) - 14.8 miles

Demographics
The 2010 United States Census reported that Mountain House had a population of 9,675. The racial makeup was 3,467 (35.8%) White, 903 (9.3%) African American, 45 (0.5%) Native American, 3,830 (39.6%) Asian, 71 (0.7%) Pacific Islander, 663 (6.9%) from other races, and 696 (7.2%) from two or more races. Hispanic or Latino of any race were 1,637 persons (16.9%).

The Census reported that 9,675 people (100% of the population) lived in households, 0 (0%) lived in non-institutionalized group quarters, and 0 (0%) were institutionalized.

There were 2,807 households, out of which 1,676 (59.7%) had children under the age of 18 living in them, 1,985 (70.7%) were opposite-sex married couples living together, 227 (8.1%) had a female householder with no husband present, 151 (5.4%) had a male householder with no wife present. There were 186 (6.6%) unmarried opposite-sex partnerships, and 31 (1.1%) same-sex married couples or partnerships. 299 households (10.7%) were made up of individuals, and 18 (0.6%) had someone living alone who was 65 years of age or older. The average household size was 3.45. There were 2,363 families (84.2% of all households); the average family size was 3.73.

The population was spread out, with 3,351 people (34.6%) under the age of 18, 501 people (5.2%) age 18 to 24, 3,780 people (39.1%) ages 25 to 44, 1,676 people (17.3%) ages 45 to 64, and 367 people (3.8%) who were 65 years of age or older. The median age was 31.4 years. For every 100 females, there were 98.9 males. For every 100 females age 18 and over, there were 94.2 males.

The homeowner vacancy rate was 4.9%; the rental vacancy rate was 5.6%. 7,444 people (76.9% of the population) lived in owner-occupied housing units and 2,231 people (23.1%) lived in rental housing units.

Government
The Mountain House Community Services District (MHCSD) is the local government and is governed since 2008 by 5 elected board members who live in the community (similar to the city council) and a general manager (similar to the city manager.) Before 2008, the MHCSD was governed by the San Joaquin County Supervisors. The MHCSD has 18 primary powers which include providing police (current contract with San Joaquin Sheriffs), fire (current contract with French Camp Fire), library services, water, sewer, garbage (current contract with West Valley Disposal), public recreation, road maintenance, street lights, graffiti abatement, CC&R (Master Restrictions) enforcement, telecommunication services, converting utilities to underground, transportation services, flood control protection, wildlife habitat mitigation, pest and weed abatement, and dissemination of information. Unlike incorporated cities, the MHCSD does not have power over land use or economic development.

The 2021-2022 board members are President Manny Moreno, VP Harry Dhillon, Directors Andy Su, Bernice Tingle, Brian Lucid. The general manager is Steve Pinkerton, who started in August 2019.

Education

Elementary and middle schools
Students in Mountain House are served by the Lammersville Joint Unified School District or LUSD. Mountain House children attend six LUSD K–8 elementary schools: Wicklund, Bethany, Questa, Altamont, Hansen, and Cordes.

Lammersville Elementary School is a K–8 school in unincorporated San Joaquin County that is part of the LUSD but not part of Mountain House that serves unincorporated Tracy.

Mountain House Elementary School, which is a K–8 school in unincorporated Alameda County, with a student body of approximately 50, is run by the independent Mountain House Elementary School District.

High schools and community college 
Mountain House High School (MHHS) opened in 2014. MHHS received the California Distinguished School Award in 2019. The school mascot is the Mustang and the school colors are royal blue and silver. Sports teams from MHHS compete in the Western Athletic Conference (WAC).

The south campus of the San Joaquin Delta College was fully completed in July 2020.

Media

Mountain House Matters is a monthly publication about Mountain House, its people and activities. It was founded in September 2012 by resident Bryan Harrison and mailed to each house in Mountain House.

The Tracy Press is a weekly newspaper that covers Tracy and Mountain House and has operated since the 19th century.

The Record (Stockton) is a daily paper that covers the San Joaquin County area.

Mountain House Wesbsite.

Infrastructure

Transportation
The nearest railway station is in Tracy, operated by Altamont Corridor Express (ACE). Livermore Amador Valley Transit Authority provides bus service to Hacienda Business Park and the Dublin/Pleasanton BART station. San Joaquin RTD provides van service to the Tracy Transit Center.

References

Census-designated places in San Joaquin County, California
Planned cities in the United States
Census-designated places in California
New Urbanism communities
Unincorporated communities in San Joaquin County, California